Les Vingt Meilleurs Récits de science-fiction is an anthology of twenty short stories of science fiction composed and presented by Hubert Juin, published by  in 1964.

Content 
 Preface
 Un homme contre la ville, by Robert Abernathy
 La patrouille du temps, by Poul Anderson, translation by Bruno Martin
 Les Mouches, by Isaac Asimov, translation by Roger Durand
 L'Homme que Vénus va condamner, by Alfred Bester
 La bibliothèque de Babel, by Jorge Luis Borges, translation by N. Ibarra
 Les mécaniques du bonheur, by Ray Bradbury
 La machine à arrêter le temps, by Dino Buzzati
 Axolotl, by Julio Cortázar
 Le père truqué, by Philip K. Dick, translation by Alain Dorémieux
 Le monde que j'avais quitté, by A. Dnieprov
 Du temps et des chats, by Howard Fast
 La Mouche, by George Langelaan
 La grande caravane, by Fritz Leiber
 La couleur tombé du ciel, by H. P. Lovecraft, translation by Louis Pauwels and Jacques Bergier
 Journal d'un monstre, by Richard Matheson
 La soif noire, by Catherine L. Moore 
 Tout smouales étaient les borogoves, by Lewis Padgett, translation by Boris Vian
 Les étranges études du Dr Paukenschlager, by Jean Ray
 Les Conquérants, by Jacques Sternberg
 Bucolique, by A. E. van Vogt, translation by Richard Chomet

Sources 
 Fiche sur iSFdb
 Fiche sur Noosfère

1964 anthologies
French anthologies
Science fiction anthologies
French-language books